Raimoana Stephen Patrick Bennett (born 15 March 1981, in Tahiti) is a footballer who plays as a forward. He previously played for AS Pirae. He currently plays for AS Dragon in the Tahiti Division Fédérale and the Tahiti national football team.

References

1981 births
Living people
French Polynesian footballers
Tahiti international footballers
Association football forwards
2002 OFC Nations Cup players